Barrow County Airport  is a public use airport located three nautical miles (6 km) east of the central business district of Winder, a city in Barrow County, Georgia, United States. It is owned by the Barrow County Airport Authority. This airport is included in the National Plan of Integrated Airport Systems for 2011–2015, which categorized it as a general aviation facility.

The airport was previously known as Northeast Georgia Regional Airport and prior to December 2005 it was known as Winder-Barrow Airport. It is home to Dragonfly Aviation, and the 148th medical company (air ambulance) of the Georgia Army National Guard.

Facilities and aircraft 
Barrow County Airport covers an area of 374 acres (151 ha) at an elevation of 943 feet (287 m) above mean sea level. It has two asphalt paved runways: 13/31 is 5,500 by 100 feet (1,676 x 30 m) and 5/23 is 3,610 by 100 feet. Runway 13/31 has an instrument landing system.

For the 12-month period ending June 27, 2011, the airport had 28,400 aircraft operations, an average of 77 per day: 82% general aviation and 18% military. At that time there were 84 aircraft based at this airport: 81% single-engine, 10% multi-engine, 4% helicopter, and 6% military.

References

External links
 WDR - Barrow County (Winder) at Georgia DOT airport directory
 Romanair Inc., the fixed-base operator (FBO) 
 Dragonfly Aviation, a flight school
 Aerial image as of March 1999 from USGS The National Map
 

Airports in Georgia (U.S. state)
Buildings and structures in Barrow County, Georgia
Transportation in Barrow County, Georgia